Charles Gifford (February 24, 1821 – 20 April 1896) was an Ontario political figure. He represented Northumberland West in the Legislative Assembly of Ontario as a Conservative member from 1872 to 1874.

He was born in Exmouth, Devon, England in 1821 and educated at University College School in London and the University of London. He studied law and was called to the English bar in 1846. He served as captain in the local militia, later becoming colonel. He was elected to the provincial legislature in a by-election called in 1872 after the resignation of Alexander Fraser, the sitting member. He was defeated in the general election held in 1875. That same year, Gifford sponsored the building of a sailing ship built in Cobourg, the Countess of Dufferin, that raced in the America's Cup in 1876.

He died at Hamilton Township, Northumberland in 1896.

References

External links

The Canadian parliamentary companion and annual register, 1872, H J Morgan

1821 births
Progressive Conservative Party of Ontario MPPs
1896 deaths
Alumni of the University of London
People educated at University College School
People from Exmouth